The Western Main Line is the main state-owned railway line between Stockholm and Gothenburg in Sweden. Its construction began in 1856 and it opened for service in 1862.

The last section between Stockholm South Station and Stockholm Central Station runs mainly on a two track bridge. Before the Stockholm City Line was opened in 2017, the bridge was a serious bottleneck, as all trains had to use the same tracks.

Operating speed 
This speed is only attained by the X 2000 tilting high-speed trains and some regional trains. The InterCity trains are limited to  due to the rolling stock. A section of the line, between Skövde and Töreboda, is the longest straight section of railway in Sweden, with almost  of track without a curve, and used in speed trials. The line has always been known for its high speeds.

Future plans
There are plans to build a high-speed line between Stockholm and Gothenburg, south of lake Vättern, Götalandsbanan.

See also
 Southern Main Line

References

External links 
 Järnväg.net page on Västra stambanan 

Railway lines in Sweden
Railway lines opened in 1856
1856 establishments in Sweden
Rail transport in Gothenburg
Rail transport in Stockholm